The Dalles Bridge is a bridge on  U.S. Route 197 (US 197) that spans the Columbia River in the United States between The Dalles, Oregon and Dallesport, Washington.

Description

The steel cantilever truss bridge is located just downstream from The Dalles Dam. Although the bridge reaches into the state of Washington, it is maintained by the Oregon Department of Transportation. The average daily traffic on the bridge (US 197) is nearly 8,400.

History

Ferry service operations began at the site in 1854, but just over a decade later, in 1865, plans for a bridge began. However, it took about another 85 years and the construction of The Dalles Dam before the bridge was finally built. Although the bridge was built in connection with the dam, the bridge opened December 18, 1953, but the dam was not completed until 1957. Due to issues with the dam, the bridge had to be redesigned as a longer one and the location moved slightly farther downstream the originally planned. Notwithstanding, the already fabricated steel components (for the original bridge design) were successfully modified and used in the newly designed bridge. The cost of construction was $2.4 million (equivalent to $ million in ).

The bridge had a toll from its opening until November 1, 1974, when the bridge's construction bond (which had been issued by Wasco County in Oregon) was paid off.

References

Further reading

External links

 Border Bridges: US197 Dalles Bridge (ODOT) (on official webpage of Washington State Department of Transportation)
 
 Breathtaking Scenery at the Dalles, Oregon Bridge and Dam (on anewlifewandering.com)
 The Dalles Bridge (on bridgehunter.com)
 The Dalles Bridge and Ferry (on columbiariverimages.com)

Road bridges in Washington (state)
Columbia River Gorge
Former toll bridges in Oregon
Former toll bridges in Washington (state)
Bridges completed in 1953
Buildings and structures in The Dalles, Oregon
Transportation buildings and structures in Wasco County, Oregon
Bridges over the Columbia River
Transportation buildings and structures in Klickitat County, Washington
Road bridges in Oregon
U.S. Route 97
Bridges of the United States Numbered Highway System
1953 establishments in Oregon
1953 establishments in Washington (state)
Steel bridges in the United States
Cantilever bridges in the United States
Truss bridges in the United States